Lancaster Bible College | Capital Seminary and Graduate School (LBC | Capital) is a private Bible college, seminary, and graduate school in Lancaster, Pennsylvania.

Lancaster Bible College offers non-credit courses, undergraduate, master's, and doctoral degree programs. The college offers several Master of Arts and Master of Education degree programs, along with three Doctorate programs.

In addition to the Lancaster location which houses all of the traditional undergraduate programs, LBC has four additional sites that offer accelerated undergraduate degrees for adult students and graduate programs. These affiliated sites are in Greenbelt, Maryland; Philadelphia, Pennsylvania; and Boca Raton, Florida.

History
Founded in 1933 by Henry J. Heydt, the original name of the school was Lancaster School of the Bible. In 1957, the college made the move to its current location in Manheim Township, Lancaster County, Pennsylvania.  In 1973, the school took on its current name, and in 1981 the Pennsylvania Department of Education gave LBC official approval to offer the Bachelor of Science in Bible degree.

In 1994, LBC's graduate school was approved to award Master of Arts in Bible, Ministry, Counseling, and Master of Education degrees in School Counseling and Consulting Resource Teacher.

In July 2012, LBC announced the launching of a Philadelphia site through its partnership with the Center for Urban Theological Studies (CUTS).  The  partnership creates the Lancaster Bible College at CUTS program [or LBC | Capital – Philadelphia], a satellite campus enables students who attend LBC | Capital – Philadelphia to receive accredited LBC | Capital diplomas.

LBC was granted an exception to Title IX in 2016 which allows it to legally discriminate against LGBT students for religious reasons.

LBC's current president is Dr. Thomas L. Kiedis. He was preceded by Dr. Peter W. Teague (1999–2020), Dr. Gilbert A. Peterson (1979–1999), Dr. Stuart E. Lease (1961–1979), Dr. William J. Randolph (1953–1961), and Dr. Henry J. Heydt (1933–1953). Dr. Teague announced his retirement on August 21, 2018, and Dr. Kiedis's became president effective February 1, 2020.

Campus locations

Lancaster, Pennsylvania
The main campus of Lancaster Bible College is situated on 109 acres in Manheim Township, Lancaster County. The campus is just north of Lancaster, Pennsylvania, and is within driving distance of Philadelphia, New York City, Baltimore, and Washington, D.C.

Recent new building and renovation projects, include:

Charles Frey Academic Center
Completed in 2016, this 50,000 square foot building is the academic hub of the Lancaster campus. It houses academic department offices, an on-campus Turkey Hill Creamery, video production studio, online radio station facility, and specially-designed spaces for Business Administration courses. The building is named after Charles F. Frey, former president of Turkey Hill.

Teague Learning Commons
Built in 2012, the Teague Learning Commons is home to the Charles and Gloria Jones Library The Commons also features Bennee's Bistro, writing center, 11 collaborative study spaces, and 3 new classroom spaces. The 43,000 square foot building utilizes environmentally-sustainable features, such as the use of natural daylight, high-efficiency lighting, and geothermal heating and cooling. The facility cost $12 million to construct and is named after the school's fifth president: Dr. Peter W. Teague.

Horst Athletic Center
The center for athletics at LBC, the Horst Athletic Center houses a gym and comprehensive fitness area.

Good Shepherd Chapel
Completed in 2001, the Good Shepherd Chapel hosts large events, concerts, and chapel services. The Chapel seats 1,600 people.

Olewine Dining Commons
The Dining Commons offers all-you-can-eat buffet meals for resident and commuter students.

Miller Hall
Centrally located on the campus, Miller Hall includes the Bookend Bookstore and a lounge for resident and commuter students alike.

Dormitories
On-campus housing includes Peterson Hall, East Hall, and Weber Hall.

Greenbelt, Maryland
In January 2013, Lancaster Bible College announced that it had acquired the academic programs of Washington Bible College and Capital Bible Seminary in Greenbelt, Maryland. Adult undergraduate, graduate, and seminary degree courses are offered at the Greenbelt site, which is about 30 minutes from Washington, D.C. and Alexandria, Virginia. The location features 11 classrooms, an on-site library, student lounge, cafe, and collaborative learning spaces. Lancaster Bible College | Capital Seminary and Graduate School now refers to this site as its Washington, DC location.

Philadelphia, Pennsylvania
The Philadelphia campus of LBC was first founded in 1971 as the Center for Urban Theological Studies (CUTS). In 2012, CUTS came under the umbrella of LBC | Capital. This campus is in the Glenwood section of north Philadelphia, and is located at Deliverance Evangelistic Church. Accelerated undergraduate and graduate courses are offered in six week modules.

Boca Raton, Florida
LBC | Capital partners with Spanish River Church in Boca Raton, Florida to provide in-person training for a Masters of Arts in Ministry program with a Church Planting concentration. Students take courses in a 6-week format, with 5 weeks of online classes combined with a two-day residency at the Boca Raton location. Students learn remotely, with less than 50% of their instruction time being in-person.

Academics
Lancaster Bible College is classified by The Carnegie Foundation for the Advancement of Teaching as a bible college with a high-undergraduate enrollment profile.

Students on average receive about $3,000 in financial aid from the college. Reduced tuition for one class per semester is offered to junior and senior high school students.

Undergraduate education
LBC's undergraduate education grants six bachelor's degrees, one associate degree, and two one-year certificates. Over one hundred and seventy faculty (part-time and full-time) teach at the college, many of whom have doctorates. Undergraduate students can select from 30 undergraduate majors (and nine minors).

Graduate education
The institution's graduate education grants six master's degrees and nine graduate certificates.

Doctorate programs
Lancaster currently offers three doctorate programs in Leadership, Biblical Studies, and Ministry.

Accreditation
Lancaster Bible College is accredited by the Middle States Commission on Higher Education (MSCHE) and the Association for Biblical Higher Education (ABHE). LBC is also accredited by the Council on Social Work Education (CSWE), the National Association of Schools of Music (NASM), and by the Commission on Sport Management Accreditation (COMSA). The school is registered with the Pennsylvania Department of Education.

Student life
Lancaster Bible College has an enrollment of more than 1,970 students, 468 of whom are graduate students. They come from 32 states and 14 foreign countries. As of 2015, LBC had 449 residents and 337 traditional undergraduate commuters. There are also over 10,000 alumni.

It is a tradition for students to receive a towel along with their diploma as they graduate, as a symbol of foot washing and a reminder to use their education to serve others.

Athletics
Lancaster Bible College teams (which are only at the college's Lancaster campus) participate as a member of the National Christian College Athletic Association (NCCAA) Division I and the National Collegiate Athletic Association (NCAA) Division III. The Chargers are a member of the NCAA's United East Conference. Men's sports include baseball, basketball, cross country, soccer, tennis and volleyball; while women's sports include basketball, cross country, field hockey, golf, lacrosse, soccer, softball, tennis and volleyball.

Athletic Awards
NEAC Presidents' Cup (2017, 2018, 2019)
NEAC Men's Basketball Championship (2016, 2018)

Trust Performing Arts Center

Lancaster Bible College runs The Trust Performing Arts Center in downtown Lancaster, Pennsylvania. Built in 1912 for the Lancaster Trust Company, the building features Beaux-Arts design from esteemed Lancaster architect C. Emlen Urban. The Trust hosts live theater, music, dance, and lectures throughout the year.

Notable alumni
LBC alumni are currently serving as missionaries, pastors, and business owners in 34 countries across 6 continents.

Wayne Cordeiro ('17),  author, and  pastor of New Hope Christian Fellowship in Hawaii), graduated with his Doctor of Ministry from Lancaster Bible College | Capital Seminary & Graduate School on May 12, 2017. He was the first person to earn a Doctor of Ministry

References

External links
Official website
Official athletics website

Bible colleges
Universities and colleges in Lancaster, Pennsylvania
Religion in Lancaster, Pennsylvania
Educational institutions established in 1933
1933 establishments in Pennsylvania